Le Tombeau de Nostradamus is a one-act farce by Alain-René Lesage.  It was first performed at the Foire de Saint Laurent in 1714.  Le Tombeau de Nostradamus is actually the final play in a series that includes La Foire de Guibray and Arlequin Mahomet.  Between the three works, Lesage created a comedy in three acts.

1714 plays
Plays by Alain-René Lesage